Asian Magazine was a weekly news magazine aimed at the Asian community. It replaced Apna Hi Ghar Samajhiye which had been on air since 1968. Broadcast on BBC1 on Sunday mornings at 10am, the programme ran for five years from 20 April 1982 until 26 April 1987 and the final edition of the programme marked the end of television programming by the BBC in Hindi and Urdu. Three months later, a new English language magazine programme, Network East, was launched and was broadcast on BBC2 on Saturday afternoons.

Throughout its time on air, a midweek companion programme Gharbar was also broadcast that was aimed at Asian women. Gharbar ended two days after the final episode of Asian Magazine was transmitted.

References

BBC Television shows
Immigration to the United Kingdom
Indian diaspora in the United Kingdom
Pakistani diaspora in the United Kingdom
British Indian mass media
British Pakistani mass media